Luis Gerardo Venegas Zumarán (born 21 June 1984) is a Mexican footballer who last played for the Ascenso MX club Cafetaleros de Chiapas.

Career
"El Loco" Venegas was noticed by Atlante when he played for Alacranes de Durango in the Primera Division A. José Guadalupe Cruz, Atlante's manager, had him transferred to their former filial team, Club León. However, Venegas was immediately called up to the first team to dispute the North American SuperLiga 2008 in the United States, playing in 3 games.

He has also played in the CONCACAF Champions League for Atlante, playing in 5 games.

He made his international debut for Mexico in September 2014.

External links
 
 

1984 births
Living people
Liga MX players
San Luis F.C. players
Atlante F.C. footballers
Atlas F.C. footballers
Chiapas F.C. footballers
Lobos BUAP footballers
Alacranes de Durango footballers
Club Puebla players
Alebrijes de Oaxaca players
Cafetaleros de Chiapas footballers
Association football defenders
Footballers from San Luis Potosí
Mexico international footballers
Mexican footballers